Patriarch Basil I may refer to:

 Basil I of Constantinople, Patriarch of Constantinople in 970–974
 Basil I of Bulgaria, Patriarch of Bulgaria  1186– 1232
 Vasilije, Serbian Patriarch in 1763–1765